The 2019–20 season is Talleres' 4th consecutive season in the top division of Argentine football. In addition to the Primera División, the club are competing in the Copa Argentina and Copa de la Superliga.

The season generally covers the period from 1 July 2019 to 30 June 2020.

Review

Pre-season
Exequiel Beltramone left Talleres on loan on 24 June 2019, signing for Mitre of Primera B Nacional. Two further players were loaned out to that division on 27 June, with Alejandro Maciel and Santiago Moyano both moving to Villa Dálmine. Their first permanent departure came hours later, as Rodrigo Burgos went to Brown. Goalkeeper Kevin Humeler went away from Talleres on 28 June, securing a contract with San Martín. Franco Fragapane completed a move in from Unión Santa Fe on 30 June. Numerous loans from the previous campaign officially expired on and around 30 June. Nicolás Giménez departed to Arsenal de Sarandí on 1 July. Soon after, centre-forwards Catriel Sánchez and Marcos Arturia joined Maciel and Moyano on loan with Villa Dálmine of tier two.

Back-to-back friendlies were set with General Paz Juniors for 3 July, as Talleres came out with respective 2–0 and 3–0 victories at the Estadio La Boutique; with Uruguayan centre-forward Junior Arias scoring in the former, ahead of a potential return to the club. Diego Valoyes, whose loan ended days prior, rejoined for a further season-long deal from La Equidad on 4 July. Talleres' first pre-season match with Instituto on 6 July was prematurely ended, with the referee blowing for full-time early due to aggressive behaviour between the two sets of players; a second encounter was still played, though ended goalless. Río Cuarto-based Estudiantes were defeated in an extended friendly on 10 July, with Leonel Rivas netting its sole goal. Junior Arias resigned on a full-time contract on 16 July.

Two goalless draws with Patronato were played out on 17 July. Nahuel Bustos returned from his loan spell in Mexico with Pachuca on 20 July. He converted a penalty in a friendly with league rivals Central Córdoba a day later, though Talleres would lose on spot-kicks 4–5 at the Estadio Mario Alberto Kempes. Aldo Araujo was loaned by Nueva Chicago on 22 July. Fernando Juárez headed off on loan to Agropecuario on 23 July. Talleres signed a loan deal with Jony of Independiente on 25 July, while Sebastián Palacios' temporary contract from Pachuca was terminated on the same day as he went the other way to Independiente.

July
On 28 July, Talleres opened their league campaign with three points after Jony netted in a one-nil win over Vélez Sarsfield. Venezuelan left winger Samuel Sosa was loaned out to Spain's Alcorcón on 29 July. Juan Ramírez departed to San Lorenzo on 30 July.

August
American attacking midfielder Joel Soñora, having trained with them earlier in the day, went on loan to Arsenal de Sarandí on 1 August. In the succeeding hours, Talleres reached an agreement with Banfield for a loan swap transaction involving, the recently signed, Junior Arias and Martín Payero. Talleres' opening loss of 2019–20 came on 3 August, as Rosario Central beat them 1–0 at the Estadio Gigante de Arroyito. Talleres were beaten in back-to-back exhibitions by Vélez Sarsfield on 10 August. Talleres and Central Córdoba experienced a 1–1 draw in the Primera División on 16 August. Talleres played out a scoreless home friendly with General Paz Juniors on 21 August, as they met the Torneo Regional Federal Amateur outfit for the third time in non-competitive action.

For the first time since 1990, Talleres won away to River Plate on 25 August thanks to a goal from Nahuel Bustos.

September
Bustos scored again on matchday five, as Talleres defeated Aldosivi 2–1 at home.

Squad

Transfers
Domestic transfer windows:3 July 2019 to 24 September 201920 January 2020 to 19 February 2020.

Transfers in

Transfers out

Loans in

Loans out

Friendlies

Pre-season
Arsenal de Sarandí revealed a pre-season friendly with Talleres on 2 July. Further matches with General Paz Juniors and Instituto were also scheduled. They'd also meet newly-promoted Primera División team Central Córdoba. Friendlies with Estudiantes (RC) and Rosario Central were confirmed on 9 July. Games with Patronato was set for 17 July, the same day as the Rosario encounter; though that was later cancelled. The match with Arsenal was also scrapped on 12 July due to bad weather.

Mid-season
A friendly match with Vélez Sarsfield was scheduled on 10 August, twelve days prior to a third friendly meeting with General Paz Juniors.

Competitions

Primera División

League table

Relegation table

Source: AFA

Results summary

Matches
The fixtures for the 2019–20 campaign were released on 10 July.

Copa Argentina

Talleres' opposition for the round of thirty-two in the Copa Argentina was revealed to be fellow Primera División team Banfield, set for 10 September; having previously been tentatively scheduled to take place in August.

Copa de la Superliga

Squad statistics

Appearances and goals

Statistics accurate as of 2 September 2019.

Goalscorers

Notes

References

Talleres de Córdoba seasons
Talleres